The 1969 Cal State Los Angeles Diablos football team represented California State College at Los Angeles—now known as California State University, Los Angeles—as a member of the Pacific Coast Athletic Association (PCAA) during the 1969 NCAA University Division football season. This was the inaugural season for the PCAA and Cal State Los Angeles's first season competing at the NCAA University Division level. Led by Walt Thurmond in his first and only season as head coach, the team compiled an overall record of 0–9 with a mark of 0–4 in conference play, placing last out of seven teams in the PCAA. The Diablos were shut out four times and scored only 67 points for the season while allowing up 329. Cal State Los Angeles played home games at the Rose Bowl in Pasadena, California.

Schedule

References

Cal State Los Angeles
Cal State Los Angeles Diablos football seasons
Cal State Los Angeles Diablos football